EVF may refer to:
 Ekal Vidyalaya, a non-profit organization involved in education and village development in India
 Electronic viewfinder
 Erythrocyte volume fraction